N.Yallappa Gopalakrishna is an Indian social worker and politician from the state of Karnataka. He is a six-time member of the Karnataka Legislative Assembly from Kudligi. He represented Molakalmuru and Bellary previously.

Constituency
He represents the Kudligi constituency which he won in a 2018. He previously served as MLA from Bellary from 2014 till 2018. He won the polls and represented the Molakalmuru constituency from 1997 to 2013.

Political party
He belonged to Indian National Congress until 2018. He joined BJP in the year 2018.

References

External links 
 Karnataka Legislative Assembly

Living people
Karnataka MLAs 2013–2018
Indian National Congress politicians from Karnataka
Karnataka MLAs 2018–2023
Bharatiya Janata Party politicians from Karnataka
1952 births